Morris Glacier is a glacier flowing north to the head of Sea Leopard Fjord in the Bay of Isles, South Georgia. it was charted in 1912–13 by American naturalist Robert Cushman Murphy, aboard the brig Daisy, who named it for Edward Lyman Morris, a botanist who was then head of the Department of Natural Science at the Brooklyn Museum.

See also
 List of glaciers in the Antarctic
 Glaciology

References

Glaciers of South Georgia